Blake Shinn (born 26 September 1987) is an Australian jockey, who rode the 2008 Melbourne Cup winner Viewed for trainer Bart Cummings.

On Melbourne Cup day 2010, Blake Shinn missed his ride in the Cup on Precedence, after a fall in Race 3 at Flemington resulted in him being taken to hospital.

Shinn also won:
 the 2021 Hong Kong Classic Mile on Excellent Proposal for trainer John Size
 the 2022 Hong Kong Champions & Chater Cup on Russian Emperor for Douglas Whyte
 the 2022 Hong Kong Gold Cup on Russian Emperor for Douglas Whyte

References

External links
 The Virtual FormGuide - Jockey Directory - Blake Shinn

1987 births
jockeys from Melbourne
living people
21st-century Australian people